"Wow" is a song by French rapper Zola released in 2020.

Charts

References 

French songs
2020 singles
2020 songs